The 1994–95 season was the 94th in the history of the Western Football League.

The league champions for the third time in their history were Taunton Town. The champions of Division One were Bridgwater Town.

Final tables

Premier Division
The Premier Division remained at 18 clubs after Liskeard Athletic and Saltash United left the league. Two clubs joined:

Backwell United, third-placed in the First Division.
Brislington, champions of the First Division.

First Division
The First Division was reduced from 21 clubs to 19, after Backwell United and Brislington were promoted to the Premier Division. No clubs joined.

References

1995-96
6